Hans Hahn (21 February 1919 – 11 October 1941) was a Luftwaffe night fighter ace and recipient of the Knight's Cross of the Iron Cross during World War II.  The Knight's Cross of the Iron Cross was awarded to recognise extreme battlefield bravery or successful military leadership; his was the first awarded to a night fighter.

Victories
During his career he claimed twelve aerial victories, all of them at night.

Most successful Night Fighter pilot until his death.  On five occasions, he returned to his base at Gilze-Rijen on one engine. Once he returned with a balloon cable wrapped around his wing in his C-4.

Before his last mission, he had brought down ten British planes in England:
His first known victory, a Wellington near Linton-on-Ouse on the night of 24–25 October 1940. 
His 2nd, a Whitley on the East Anglia coast, 50 km east of Withernsea, the night of 2–3 January 1941. 
His 3rd, a Hudson at Leeming on the night of 12–13 March 1941. 
His 4th, a Blenheim over England on the night of 13–14 March 1941. 
His 5th, a Hampden at Upwood, 8 April 1941. 
His 6th, a Wellington at Wellingore on 8 April 1941. 
His 7th, a Hampden SE of Waddington the night of 16–17 April 1941. 
His 8th, a Herford at Digby on 21 April 1941. 
His 9th, a Fulmar at Stoke Holy Cross on 3–4 May 1941. 
His 10th, a Blenheim at Feltwell, 5 May 1941.

Death

Hans Hahn was killed near Grantham, England, on 11 October 1941 after his JU 88 collided with a RAF Oxford trainer aircraft he targeted. He is buried at Cannock Chase German war cemetery.

Awards
 Aviator badge
 Front Flying Clasp of the Luftwaffe
 Iron Cross (1939)
 2nd Class
 1st Class
 Knight's Cross of the Iron Cross on 9 July 1941 as Leutnant and pilot in the I./Nachtjagdgeschwader 2

Notes

References

Citations

Bibliography

 
 
 

1919 births
1941 deaths
Luftwaffe pilots
German World War II flying aces
Recipients of the Knight's Cross of the Iron Cross
Luftwaffe personnel killed in World War II
People from the Rhine Province
Burials at Cannock Chase German Military Cemetery
Military personnel from Mönchengladbach
Aviators killed in aviation accidents or incidents in England